Sunday Sharpe is an American country music singer. She charted seven times on the Hot Country Songs chart in the 1970s, reaching the Top 20 with "I'm Having Your Baby" (a female version of Paul Anka's "(You're) Having My Baby") and "A Little at a Time". She released one album, I'm Having Your Baby, for United Artists Records.

Discography

Albums

Singles

References

Year of birth missing (living people)
Living people
American women country singers
American country singer-songwriters
United Artists Records artists
21st-century American women